Elway Bevin (c.1554-1638) was a Welsh-born organist and composer.

Briefly a vicar choral at Wells Cathedral, in 1585 he was appointed Master of the Choristers at Bristol Cathedral. He was sworn a gentleman-extraordinary of the Chapel Royal on 3 June 1605, and is said to have been a pupil of Thomas Tallis.

In 1631 Bevin published the work by which he is best known, 'A Briefe and Short Instruction of the Art of Musicke...' and Benjamin Cosyn's 'Virginal Book' has a service by him included amongst six entitled 'These are ye Six Services for the King's Royall Chappell.'

References

16th-century English composers
English classical composers
English male classical composers
English classical organists
British male organists
Cathedral organists
Gentlemen of the Chapel Royal
1554 births
1638 deaths
Male classical organists